The Puerto Hurraco massacre was a mass murder that occurred on the afternoon of Sunday, 26 August 1990 in Puerto Hurraco, a village in Benquerencia de la Serena, municipality in the Province of Badajoz, (Extremadura, Spain). It has 135 inhabitants (200 in summer). The perpetrators were the brothers Emilio and Antonio Izquierdo, members of the "Izquierdo family", who murdered 9 people in the streets of their hometown, some of them belonged to their rivals, the "Cabanillas family" (two girls of 13 and 14 years old among them), and caused serious injuries to 12 others. The two then fled, but they were arrested during the next morning and eventually sentenced each to 684 years in prison. They died in prison, aged 72 and 74.

Background 
The quarrels between the Cabanillas (called "the Amadeos") and Izquierdo families (the "Patas Pelás") arose from a boundary dispute in 1967, when Amadeo Cabanillas entered with a plough on a farm owned by Manuel Izquierdo in Puerto Hurraco. There was also, at that time, a history of unrequited love between Amadeo Cabanillas and Luciana Izquierdo; both fell in love, but he finally refused to marry her, a fact that affected Luciana very much. A few days after the rejection, on January 22, 1967, Amadeo Cabanillas was murdered by Jerónimo Izquierdo, the oldest of the Izquierdo brothers, who was imprisoned for this crime and served a 14-year sentence.

As soon as Jerónimo Izquierdo met his sentence in 1986, he returned to Puerto Hurraco aiming to avenge the death of his elderly mother, Isabel Izquierdo Caballero, who died two years earlier in a fire in her house on the street Carrera No. 9, on October 18, 1984. The Izquierdo family blamed Antonio Cabanillas, brother of Amadeo, for being the author of the crime; even though the police investigation did not find perpetrator. That is the reason why Jerónimo tried to kill Antonio with a knife, seriously injuring him, although he managed to survive.
As a result Jerónimo Izquierdo entered the psychiatric hospital on August 8, 1986, and died nine days later.

The shooting 
On Sunday, 26 August 1990, six years after the fire and four years after the stabbing of Antonio Cabanillas by Jerónimo Izquierdo, his two brothers, Emilio and Antonio Izquierdo, aged 56 and 52 respectively, said goodbye to their sisters, Ángela and Luciana Izquierdo in their house in Monterrubio de la Serena, assuring that "We are going to hunt turtledoves". Dressed as hunters and armed with 12 gauge shotguns, they hid at nightfall in an alley in town and then came out and shoot cartridges against numerous members of the Cabanillas family who were there, they were specifically looking for Antonio Cabanillas Rivera. Subsequently, the shooting would result against anyone who accidentally came across them in the street. The incident resulted in 9 people dead, two little girls who were sisters of the Cabanillas family among them, Encarnación and Antonia Cabanillas (daughters of Antonio), aged 13 and 14 respectively, who were playing in the square and were brutally shot at short distance by the Izquierdo brothers. There were over 12 wounded people with different degrees of severity. Some ended up paraplegic and in a wheelchair for the rest of their lives. The third sister of Encarnación and Antonia, María del Carmen Cabanillas, avoided the massacre since she was at the time at her cousin's home. A six-year-old-child, Guillermo Ojeda Sánchez, was hit in the head, and left in a coma.

Again, the crime was committed as an act of vengeance since they considered the victims guilty for a fire that was set on one of their properties in which their mother, Isabel Izquierdo, died. The ammunition used were buckshots, cartridges that contain nine thick lead pellets. After their escape, the Izquierdo brothers even got to shoot against one unit of the Civil Guard that arrived from their barracks house back at Monterrubio de la Serena, alerted by the neighbours. Two agents of the Civil Guard were seriously injured on the inside of their vehicle before they could even stop the murderers or even defend themselves with their service weapons.

After the slaughter, the Izquierdo brothers ran towards the hill, Sierra del Oro, sown field with olive groves. The Civil Guard units that were looking for them found them sleeping nine hours after the beginning of the tragedy and both of them were arrested without putting up any resistance. They were taken to the court in Castuera (Badajoz), far from Puerto Hurraco, and from the entirely possible chance of settling the score. After his detention, Emilio Izquierdo, did not show even the smallest sign of regret: “Let the town suffer now like I have been suffering all this time”, while his brother, Antonio claimed they had the idea of continuing with the carnage: “If you hadn’t caught us we would have come back to shot everyone during the burial for the dead”  The brothers thought they had shot a score of 20 people, but they really shot twenty-one people, but they only got to kill seven of them instantly, and two injured that died within weeks at the hospital Infanta Cristina in Badajoz.

The two sisters, Luciana and Ángela, 62 and 49 years old respectively, ran as fast as they could up to their house in Monterrubio de la Serena and then caught the train to Madrid, even though four days later (on the 30 August 1990) they had to come back to Castuera to testify before the judge. Outside the court they had Antonio Cabanillas waiting for them, father of the two little girls murdered, with a knife on his hand, but he was quickly disarmed and arrested by the Civil Guard that was guarding the building in case there was any chance of retaliation.

Victims 
Reinaldo Benítez Romero, 62
Manuel Cabanillas Carrillo, 55 
Antonia Cabanillas Rivero, 14
Encarnación Cabanillas Rivero, 12, sister of Antonia Cabanillas 
Isabel Carrillo Dávila, 70
Andrés Ojeda Gallardo, 36, son-in-law of Isabel Carrillo
Araceli Murillo Romero, 60 
Antonia Murillo Fernández, 58
José Penco Rosales, 43

Among those wounded were: Guillermo Ojeda Sánchez, 6, Antonio Cabanillas Benítez, 24, Juan Antonio Fernández Trejo, 31, Ángela Sánchez Murillo, 42, Felicitas Benítez Romero, 59, Vicenta Izquierdo Sánchez, Isabel Cabanillas, and Manuel Calero Márquez.

The trial 
In the trial held three and a half years later, in January 1994, the two Izquierdo brothers were sentenced to 684 years in prison and 300 million pesetas, the former Spanish currency, in compensation. The magistrate stressed: "Their intelligence is within the norm, a fact that is corroborated since that they were capable of managing a flock of about a thousand sheep, had leased farms and possess, with the crisis that is going on in the countryside, a 10 million pesetas passbook", "the accused outlined a 'plan to exterminate' the largest possible number of inhabitants of the town of Puerto Hurraco", "they chose the alley and the night because they knew the habits of their neighbours and they knew that 'at that time and from that place they could kill more people'" and the judge also stressed "a cultural primitivism and an affective impoverishment that determines contempt for human life" and "the accused fed their own phobias and obsessions due to an abnormal social isolation and the fact that they lived together in a closed group (in reference to all the brothers)".

The prosecution initially charged sisters Angela and Luciana Izquierdo with allegedly inducing the crime, but two years later they were acquitted after the judge failed to find evidence to prove their direct involvement in the events. However, they were admitted to the Psychiatric Hospital of Merida on medical recommendation, as they were diagnosed with a paranoid process and a shared delusional disorder related to revenge for the death of their mother Isabel Izquierdo, six years earlier, in a fire.

The public prosecutor as well as the prosecution forgot about their demands of exile for both defendants once they were released from jail, which could be at the age of 70.

Death of the murderers 
Fourteen years later, Luciana Izquierdo (1928–2005) died on 1 February 2005, in the mental hospital of Merida at the age of 77. She was thought to be the true instigator of the crimes in Puerto Hurraco (in her youth she was rejected by her boyfriend, a member of the Cabanillas family). In November of that same year, just ten months after, her sister Angela Izquierdo (1941–2005) also died in the same mental hospital at the age of 64.

One year after his sisters’ death, Emilio Izquierdo (1934–2006), who was 72 at that time, died of natural causes on 13 December 2006 when he was in Badajoz prison. He suffered from heart problems and was found dead in his cell by a prison officer. His brother Antonio attended the funeral and next to his brother's tomb he said: “Brother, go in peace because our mother has been avenged.” 

Three years and six months after Emilio's death and nineteen years after the massacre, Antonio Izquierdo (1938–2010), the last of the Izquierdo brothers, died on 25 April 2010, in the prison of Badajoz when he hanged himself with the bed sheets. He was found in his cell at the nurse unit, where the inmate was staying at the time, due to his delicate health. The prison officers found him at 2 am while they were on their night shift. Although they immediately called the medical services, they were only able to determine his death. Antonio committed suicide the very same day he was supposed to be released from prison if the Parot Doctrine had not been applied. The Doctrine was passed by The Supreme Court in 2006. Antonio was serving a sentence of 25 years, but the doctrine left him with another 5 years to serve. The inmate showed his disconformity with the application of the Parot Doctrine.

None of the five Izquierdo brothers had descendants, so the lineage ended with the death of the last brother, Antonio. Only a daughter of the Cabanillas family survived the massacre, Mari Carmen, who had two children. Both surnames will disappear (Izquierdo and Cabanillas) because these children will take the Cabanillas surname in the second place. Nevertheless, the Izquierdo family couldn't accomplish its objective of killing the Cabanillas family after this series of tragic events.

Pop culture and media 
Fourteen years later, events were brought to the big screen. El 7º día was released in (2004), directed by Carlos Saura and written by Ray Loriga, starring Juan Diego and José Luis Gómez as the massacre perpetrators, Antonio and Emilio. Victoria Abril and Ana Wagener played Luciana and Ángela, respectively and Ramón Fontserè played the murderer Jerónimo Izquierdo, before the crimes of 1990. The case also inspired the song "Veraneo en Puerto Hurraco" by the band Def Con Dos, which ironically addresses the massacre. Italian skapunk band Persiana Jones released an album named Puerto Hurraco in 1999.

References

See also 

 Running amok
 Spree killer

Massacres in 1990
Deaths by firearm in Spain
Massacres in Spain
Spree shootings in Spain
Province of Badajoz
August 1990 events in Europe
1990 murders in Spain
1990 mass shootings in Europe